Nikola Mektić and Mate Pavić defeated Rajeev Ram and Joe Salisbury in the final, 6–4, 7–6(7–4), to win the men's doubles tennis title at the 2021 Italian Open. The second seeds did not drop a set en route to their third ATP Tour Masters 1000 victory together and their sixth title overall of the season. The all-Croatian pair also became the second doubles team to have reached the finals of the first four Masters 1000 tournaments in a season after the Bryan brothers, who last accomplished the feat in 2018. Ram and Salisbury were competing for their first title of the season and their fourth title together.

Marcel Granollers and Horacio Zeballos were the defending champions, but they lost in the quarterfinals to Ram and Salisbury.

Seeds

Draw

Finals

Top half

Bottom half

ATP doubles main-draw entrants

Seeds

Rankings are as of May 3, 2021.

Other entrants
The following pairs received wildcards into the doubles main draw: 
  Marco Cecchinato /  Stefano Travaglia
  Fabio Fognini /  Lorenzo Musetti
  Lorenzo Sonego /  Andrea Vavassori

The following pairs received entry into the doubles main draw as alternates:
  Marcelo Arévalo /  Matwé Middelkoop
  Ariel Behar /  Gonzalo Escobar
  Liam Broady /  Andy Murray
  Petros Tsitsipas /  Stefanos Tsitsipas

Withdrawals
Before the tournament
  Félix Auger-Aliassime /  Hubert Hurkacz → replaced by  Liam Broady /  Andy Murray
  Márton Fucsovics /  Casper Ruud → replaced by  Marcelo Arévalo /  Matwé Middelkoop
  Karen Khachanov /  Andrey Rublev → replaced by  Petros Tsitsipas /  Stefanos Tsitsipas
  Tim Pütz /  Alexander Zverev → replaced by  Ariel Behar /  Gonzalo Escobar

References

External links
Main draw

Men's Doubles